The 6th Madgwick Cup was a non-championship Formula Two motor race held at Goodwood Circuit on 26 September 1953. The race was won by Roy Salvadori in a Connaught Type A-Lea Francis, starting from pole and setting fastest lap. Stirling Moss in a Cooper T24-Alta finished second and Tony Rolt was third in another Type A.

Results

References

Madgwick Cup
Madgwick Cup